Worlds Beyond is a role-playing game published by Other World Games in 1990. It was acquired by Precis Intermedia in 2020.

Description
Worlds Beyond is a science-fiction space-adventure system in which the player characters can be human or alien (three alien races are available). Character creation rules are skill-based. Rules cover generation of planets, spaceships, and robots. Six sample spaceships are described, with deck plans. Over 20 worlds are described as a campaign background.

Publication history
Worlds Beyond was designed by Frank S. Shewmake with Steve Douglas, Douglas Laedtke, John Damon Lavette, Leigh Skilling, and Gary Warth, with a cover by Frank Lurz, and published by Other World Games in 1990 as a 160-page book. It was re-published as a classic reprint in 2021 by Precis Intermedia.

Reception
Lawrence Schick comments: "A solid system, simpler than most, but worth a look if Traveller seems too intimidating."

Reviews
White Wolf #21 (June/July, 1990)
Voyages to the Worlds of SF Gaming (Issue 11 - Apr 1990)

References

Role-playing games introduced in 1990
Space opera role-playing games